Tiia-Ester Loitme (born 19 December 1933 in Tallinn) is an Estonian conductor.

1944-1949 she studied the piano at local music school (was a part of Tallinn State Conservatory). In 1949 she and her family was deported to Siberia. In 1956 she returned to Estonia. In 1965 she graduated from Tallinn State Conservatory in choir conduction speciality.

1965-1975 and 1987-2006 she worked as a music teacher and choir conductor at Tallinn English College.

Since 1970 she has been the conductor for girls' choir Ellerhein.

References

Living people
1933 births
Estonian conductors (music)
Estonian Academy of Music and Theatre alumni
Gulag detainees
Recipients of the Order of the White Star, 3rd Class
People from Tallinn